Alexander Hans Christian Farnerud (born 1 May 1984) is a Swedish former professional footballer who played as attacking midfielder. Starting out at Landskrona BoIS in the early 2000s, he went on to represent clubs in France, Germany, Denmark, Switzerland, and Italy before retiring at FC Chiasso in 2022. A full international between 2003 and 2010, he won eight caps and scored two goals for the Sweden national team.

Club career

Landskrona BoIS
Born in Landskrona, Farnerud made his professional debut with Landskrona BoIS. He scored in one of his first Allsvenskan matches, a 2–1 home win against reigning champions Hammarby.

Strasbourg 
On 15 November 2003, Farnerud was bought by France's Strasbourg, being an automatic first-choice in his two-and-a-half-year spell. In his first and third seasons in Ligue 1, he played alongside older brother Pontus who was first loaned by Monaco, then acquired.

Stuttgart
Upon Strasbourg's 2006 relegation, Farnerud moved to VfB Stuttgart in Germany, on a four-year deal. He was used sporadically over the course of two Bundesliga campaigns, appearing nine times for the 2007 champions.

Brøndby IF 
On 8 July 2008, Farnerud signed with the Danish Superliga club Brøndby.

Young Boys
On 18 January 2011, Farnerud changed clubs and countries again, joining Young Boys from Switzerland for an undisclosed fee until 2014. He made his Super League debut on 13 February in the 4–2 victory over Zürich, and on 16 April he also netted twice for the hosts against Bellinzona (4–0).

Torino
On 18 June 2013, Farnerud was signed by Italian side Torino for €1.8 million on a three-year contract. He made his official debut on 17 August, in a Coppa Italia tie against Pescara which ended in a 1–2 loss. On 20 October he scored his first goal in Serie A, opening the scoreline in an eventual 3–3 home draw to Inter Milan.

After a difficult start to the season, in which he was often benched, Farnerud became a regular and consistent performer for Toro, netting again in the 14th round against Genoa and two days later against Udinese.

BK Häcken
On 9 August 2016, Farnerud returned to his native country, signing a long-term deal with BK Häcken and re-joining his childhood friend Rasmus Lindgren at his new club. He played 11 matches and scored three goals in his debut campaign, and went to provide eight assists during his spell before attracting a serious knee injury in a fixture against IK Sirius on 22 July 2017; due to his recurrent physical ailments, he chose to leave by mutual consent in November.

Helsingborg
In October 2018, Farnerud joined Helsingborgs IF ahead of the upcoming season. In January 2020, following his release, he trialled with 3. Liga team SG Sonnenhof Großaspach.

IFK Göteborg 
On 14 May 2020, Farnerud signed with IFK Göteborg. He scored the winning goal in the 2020 Svenska Cupen final when Göteborg beat Malmö FF 2–1 in overtime.

FC Chiasso and retirement 
In July 2021, Farnerud signed with Swiss Promotion League side FC Chiasso on a one-year contract. He announced his retirement from professional football in June 2022, having played 14 games and scored 1 goal for the club.

International career

Youth 
After appearing for all the Swedish national youth teams, Farnerud became a permanent fixture in the under-21s, with whom he participated in the 2004 UEFA European Championship.

Senior 
He won his first cap for the Sweden national team on 16 February 2003 at age 18, in a King's Cup fixture against Qatar; four days later, in the same competition, he scored his first goal to help to a 2–0 defeat of Thailand.

On 21 March 2015, after more than five years of absence, Farnerud was called by manager Erik Hamrén for a Euro 2016 qualifier against Moldova and a friendly with Iran.

He won a total of eight caps and scored two goals during his time with the national team.

Personal life
Farnerud's older brother, Pontus, also played professional football. He too was a midfielder and a Swedish international before retiring in 2013.

Career statistics

International 

International goals

Honours
Stuttgart
 Bundesliga: 2006–07

Strasbourg
 Coupe de la Ligue: 2004–05

IFK Göteborg
 Svenska Cupen: 2019–20
Sweden
 King's Cup: 2003

References

External links
 
 
 
 
 
 
 

1984 births
Living people
Swedish footballers
Association football midfielders
Allsvenskan players
Landskrona BoIS players
BK Häcken players
Helsingborgs IF players
IFK Göteborg players
Ligue 1 players
RC Strasbourg Alsace players
Bundesliga players
VfB Stuttgart players
Danish Superliga players
Brøndby IF players
Swiss Super League players
BSC Young Boys players
Serie A players
Torino F.C. players
Sweden youth international footballers
Sweden under-21 international footballers
Sweden international footballers
Swedish expatriate footballers
Expatriate footballers in France
Expatriate footballers in Germany
Expatriate men's footballers in Denmark
Expatriate footballers in Switzerland
Expatriate footballers in Italy
Swedish expatriate sportspeople in France
Swedish expatriate sportspeople in Germany
Swedish expatriate sportspeople in Denmark
Swedish expatriate sportspeople in Switzerland
Swedish expatriate sportspeople in Italy
People from Landskrona Municipality
Footballers from Skåne County